Linkletter is a surname found primarily in the Orkney Islands, but possibly subject to Old Norse influence:

People:
 Art Linkletter and his descendants:
 Art Linkletter (1912–2010), Canadian-born radio and television personality
 Jack Linkletter (1937–2007), actor & journalist 
 Diane Linkletter (1948–1969), celebrity family member
 Nicole Linkletter (born 1985), American model
 Scott Linkletter, founder of Cows Creamery in Prince Edward Island, Canada